The Witch trials in the Italian states of present-day Italy are a complicated issue. Witch trials could be managed by a number of different secular courts as well as by the Roman Inquisition, and documentation has been only partially preserved in either case.  A further complication is the fact that Italy was politically split between a number of different states during the time period in which the witch trials occurred; and that historiography has traditionally separated the history of Northern Italy and Southern Italy. All of these issues complicate the research of witch trials in present-day Italy, and the estimations of the intensity and number of executions has varied between hundreds to thousands of victims.

History

Intensity

Northern Italy experienced its first wave of witch trials earlier than most of Europe, and it fact experienced its peak during the Italian Renaissance.  After a high-profile case in Milan in 1384, there were a number of witch trials in Italy during the 15th-century. A number of mass witch trials with many executions took place in Cuneo 1477, Pavia 1479, Valtellina 1460, 1483 and 1485, in Canavese 1472 and 1475–76, in Peveragno in 1485 and 1489 and in Carignano in 1493–94.  The Italian witch trials reached their peak during the Italian Wars.  After the 1530s, witchcraft executions in Italy decreased, and for several decades, lesser punishments than the death penalty became common in Italian witch trials.

The Italian states experienced a second wave of witchcraft executions during the Counter-Reformation, and reached their peak between circa 1580 and 1660, before they finally decreased.

Witch trials of the Inquisition

Normally, the Inquisition only conducted witch trials on the request of the local authorities and public.  The Inquisition did conduct some of the biggest witch trials in Italy, namely the Val Camonica witch trials of 1518-1521 and the Sondrino witch trials of 1523, but these were exceptions to a general rule.   Normally, the Inquisition respected normal legal practices and the legal rights of the accused more than secular courts when conducting witch trials, and the Inquisition are known to have revoked sentenced made by a secular court in witchcraft cases when the rights of the accused had been violated in the eyes of contemporary law.

The Inquisition did not consider witchcraft a priority compared to heresy, particularly after the introduction of the Counter-Reformation, maintained the policy that the witches' sabbath was an illusion caused by Satan rather than real, and did not accept a charge of witchcraft based solely on the testimony of an already charged person.  As in the case of heresy, people who were condemned guilty of witchcraft by the Inquisition and repented, were not executed the first time they were condemned, only if they relapsed and repeated the crime, which also contrasted to the secular courts.

Secular witch trials

Traditionally, the research of witch trials in Italy have focused on the witch trials conducted by the Inquisition, which gives an incorrect impression of the scale of witch trials, since most witch trials in Italy were conducted by local secular courts and not by the Inquisition.

The Italian states experienced a second wave of witchcraft executions during the Counter-Reformation, and reached their peak between circa 1580 and 1660, before they finally decreased.  During the second Italian witch hunt of 1580–1660, the majority of witch trials were conducted by local secular courts, rather than the Inquisition.  During the second wave, the largest mass witch trials were the one of Val di Fassa in 1573, 1627–31 and 1643–1644; the Val di Non in 1611–1615, Turino in 1619, Nogaredo in 1640-1647, and Valtellina of the 1670s.

Secular courts continued to conduct witch trials until the 18th-century, though the intensity lessened from the second half of the 17th-century and executions as the result of witch trials became fever.  The last withcraft executions by secular courts in Northern Italy took place in Piedmonte in 1723 and in Venice in 1724.

See also
 Witchcraft in Italy
 Witch trials in Sicily
 Witch trials in the early modern period

References 

1384 establishments in Italy
1724 disestablishments in Italy
Early Modern law
Early Modern politics
Legal history of Italy
Political history of Italy
Social history of Italy
Witch trials in Italy
16th century in Italy
17th century in Italy